The 2022 Internationaux de Strasbourg was a professional tennis tournament played on outdoor clay courts in Strasbourg, France. It was the 36th edition of the tournament and part of the WTA 250 tournaments of the 2022 WTA Tour. It took place at the Tennis Club de Strasbourg between 15 and 21 May 2022.

Finals

Singles

  Angelique Kerber def.  Kaja Juvan 7–6(7–5), 6–7(0–7), 7–6(7–5)

This is Kerber's first title of the year and 14th of her career.

Doubles

  Nicole Melichar-Martinez /  Daria Saville def.  Lucie Hradecká /  Sania Mirza, 5–7, 7–5, [10–6]

Singles main-draw entrants

Seeds

 Rankings are as of 9 May 2022.

Other entrants
The following players received wildcards into the singles main draw:
  Angelique Kerber 
  Carole Monnet
  Karolína Plíšková
  Samantha Stosur

The following player received entry using a protected ranking into the singles main draw:
  Daria Saville

The following players received entry from the qualifying draw:
  Julie Gervais 
  Lina Glushko 
  Ekaterina Makarova 
  Aliaksandra Sasnovich

The following players received entry as lucky losers:
  Nefisa Berberović
  Angelina Gabueva
  Katharina Hobgarski
  Yana Morderger

Withdrawals 
 Before the tournament
  Ekaterina Alexandrova → replaced by  Anna-Lena Friedsam
  Madison Brengle → replaced by  Ana Konjuh
  Camila Giorgi → replaced by  Nefisa Berberović
  Anhelina Kalinina → replaced by  Angelina Gabueva
  Barbora Krejčiková → replaced by  Kaja Juvan
  Tereza Martincová → replaced by  Yana Morderger
  Jeļena Ostapenko → replaced by  Harmony Tan
  Jasmine Paolini → replaced by  Heather Watson
  Alison Riske → replaced by  Bernarda Pera
  Shelby Rogers → replaced by  Océane Dodin
  Elena Rybakina → replaced by  Diane Parry
  Kateřina Siniaková → replaced by  Varvara Gracheva
  Clara Tauson → replaced by  Maryna Zanevska
  Jil Teichmann → replaced by  Katharina Hobgarski
  Markéta Vondroušová → replaced by  Fiona Ferro

Doubles main-draw entrants

Seeds 

 1 Rankings as of 9 May 2022.

Other entrants 
The following pair received entry using a protected ranking:
  Bibiane Schoofs /  Rosalie van der Hoek

Withdrawals
Before the tournament
  Kirsten Flipkens /  Nicole Melichar-Martinez → replaced by  Nicole Melichar-Martinez /  Daria Saville

References

External links
 Official website

2022 WTA Tour
2022
2022 in French tennis
May 2022 sports events in France